Quercus rotundifolia, the holm oak or ballota oak, is an evergreen oak native to the western Mediterranean region, with the majority on the Iberian Peninsula and minor populations in Northwest Africa. The species was first described by Jean-Baptiste Lamarck in 1785. It is the typical species of the Iberian dehesa or montado, where its sweet-astringent acorns are a source of food for livestock, particularly the Iberian pig. Its acorns have been used for human nourishment since the Neolithic era (7,000 BC). It is placed in section Ilex. Some authors described it as a subspecies of Quercus ilex.

Description

It has small, leathery, dark-green leaves with a glaucous, densely pubescent underside usually suborbicular to elliptical or lanceolate and are generally spiny to dentate on a younger tree. It has a semi-hemispheric cupule.

It flowers from February to April. Seedlings will start flowering at about 8 years old, but they will not start producing acorns until 15 to 20 years old, although trees in humid, good quality soils can start its production as early as 10 years. The acorns ripen in autumn, about 6 months after pollination.

It is a very resilient tree that can survive temperatures below , and can live in conditions with temperatures that on occasion reach  during summer months.

As opposed to Quercus ilex, its acorns have a very low level of bitter tannins and as a result are generally sweet and a good energy source for livestock.

Distribution and habitat

Quercus rotundifolia is native to most of the Iberian Peninsula (Portugal and Spain), but is also distributed throughout Morocco, especially in the Atlas Mountains, Algeria, Tunisia, southern France (Languedoc-Roussillon) and the Balearic Islands. It is present in continental, sub-continental or littoral Mediterranean areas but always in climatic conditions determined by a fairly hot and dry summer, which excludes the wet, oceanic influenced climate of Green Spain and northwest Portugal, but wet winters as the tree is absent from arid climates, or with no real wet months like southeast Spain. It grows in a variety of soils and is indifferent to edaphic conditions, persisting in soils with pH 6 to 8. The tree is also associated in holm oak/Atlas cedar forests of the Atlas Mountains. In Morocco, some of these mixed forests are habitat to the endangered Barbary macaque.

The tree inhabits dense oak forests to open oak forests or sub-savanna ecosystems, from sea level up to  a.s.l. It can live in all altitudes in Portugal, switching with Quercus suber. The grasses and herbs support low-density mixed animal grazing at the wetter time of year, and when the grasses die out in summer the acorns from the oak trees (at densities of 30 to 50 trees per hectare), plus oak foliage and some saved crops support the animals until the grasses return. It can tolerate frost and short periods of light snow.

Threats

This species is threatened by the destruction of its habitat to make way for agriculture and to plant vineyards, pine or eucalyptus plantations. Like other perennial oaks in the Iberian Peninsula, Quercus rotundifolia is also affected by Phytophthora cinnamomi, that is becoming more dangerous due to the increased frequency and duration of droughts associated with climate changes and especially in Portugal, a decline for the taxa has been reported. The tree is also affected by wildfires, though it regenerates well from resprouts after it. The leaves are also eaten by case moth caterpillars, but the tree is not particularly threatened by them. In New Zealand, the caterpillar of the puriri moth has also been observed to feed on the tree's bark. The tree is notably resistant to honey fungus.

The holm oak, along with the cork oak is a protected tree by law in Portugal.

Use

The holm oak's wood is traditionally used to make charcoal. The acorns can be consumed both by animals and humans. The bark is rich in tannin components for traditional medicinal uses. Quercus rotundifolia is also used as a host plant for the production of both the black truffle (Tuber melanosporum) and the summer truffle (Tuber aestivum var aestivum).

The tree's acorns have been used by humans since the Neolithic era. The inhabitants of the southern Iberian Peninsula 9,000 years ago collected acorns of Q. rotundifolia in autumn (November), gently toasted them in order to preserve them throughout the year, ground them in manual granite mills, and ingested the flour in soups or breads.

Notable trees

It was above a Quercus rotundifolia where an apparition of the Blessed Virgin Mary, reported by Francisco, Jacinta and Lúcia, took place. The small tree has since disappeared and its pieces are now relics, but other Quercus rotundifolia near the site persist till this day, one of them being a tree of public interest.

Gallery

References

rotundifolia
Flora of Southwestern Europe
Flora of North Africa
Flora of Portugal
Flora of Spain
Flora of Morocco
Flora of France
Flora of Algeria
Flora of Tunisia
Trees of Mediterranean climate
Plants described in 1785
Flora of the Mediterranean Basin